Microsoft Mesh is a collaboration and communications platform developed by Microsoft. Engadget described it as "the company's ambitious new attempt at unifying holographic virtual collaboration across multiple devices, be they VR headsets, AR (like HoloLens), laptops or smartphones".

It makes use of elements of the AltspaceVR platform Microsoft acquired in 2017.

References

External links  
 Introducing Microsoft Mesh - Microsoft's official site

Augmented reality
History of human–computer interaction
Microsoft software
Mixed reality
Metaverse